Kibwezi is a town in Makueni County, Kenya.

Kibwezi town is the headquarters of Kibwezi division, one of 15 administrative divisions in Makueni County. The division has a population of 80,236, of whom 4,695 are classified urban. The division has four locations: Kikumbulyu, Kinyambu, Masongaleni and Utithi.  Kibwezi town is located within Kikumbulyu location.

Kibwezi is also named for Kibwezi Constituency, the local electoral constituency. Kibwezi town does not seat a local authority but is part of Makueni County.

Education

The largest school is the Kibwezi Educational Centre, a partnership between the Presbyterian Church of East Africa (PCEA) and Burke Presbyterian Church (PCUSA). It contains a polytechnic offering two-year vocational programs in carpentry, masonry, welding, and tailoring. There is also a secretarial department which requires students to have graduated from secondary school. A primary school and preschool are for grades one though eight. Scholarships are available for need based students such as orphans. There are around thirty children in the greater Kibwezi area supported and sometimes under scholarship for educational costs.
Students from very needy families benefit from the government disbursed bursaries.

Banking and local economy
There are two banks and two credit unions in town. The largest bank is the Kenya Commercial Bank. The Largest Credit Union is the Sidian Bank.

One Microfinance program, run by Empowering the Poor in Development(EPID) - Kenya partnered with the United States-based, 501(c)(3) non-profit, The Walking with Africans Foundation (WAF) focuses on organizing and providing initial funding to Rotating Savings and Credit Association (ROSCA) groups. EPID and WAF jointly oversee 5 ROSCA groups totaling 120 members in the greater Kibwezi area.  The program provides initial loans without collateral, allowing members of peer groups the opportunity to co-guarantee repayment of loans and assume management of the revolving fund. The small interest collected from loans is reinvested into lending to more participants. To qualify and remain in the program, participants must meet strict monitoring criteria and pay back the original loans through small weekly repayments and contributions to joint savings. Qualified participants who own small businesses or who seek to establish small business enterprises are extended loans on a short-term repayment cycle (3 to 6 months). WAF was founded by James Munthali, a retired economist with the International Monetary Fund (IMF), and other members of Burke Presbyterian Church in the suburbs of Washington D.C., United States of America.

M-Pesa is a branchless banking service, meaning that it is designed to enable users to complete basic banking transactions without the need to visit a bank branch. The continuing success of M-Pesa in Kenya has been due to the creation of a highly popular, affordable payment service with only limited involvement of a bank.

Religion

There are several religions represented in the town. There is a mosque for the local Muslim community and several churches of varying Christian denominations.  The two largest congregations are Catholic and the Presbyterian Church of East Africa (PCEA).

Presbyterian
Kibwezi is defined by the Presbyterian Church of East Africa as a Nendeni Area, a region for church growth.  There is one church located inside the Kibwezi Educational Centre. This has been named the Bethel Church.  Furthermore, there are approximately 14 smaller congregations in the surrounding villages near Kibwezi. Rev. Lauden Kangele is the pastor of the Kibwezi Nendeni area.  The village churches are served on Sunday by evangelists (not pastors) employed by the Kibwezi Bethel Church.  A few of these areas are:
Kikauni
Mbui-nzau
Usalama
Muusini
Maikuu
Misuuni
Masongaleni
Kyumani
Makindu
Kisingo
Kilema

Kibwezi has also other churches e.g. Seventh Day Adventist Church near Kambua guest house and opposite to Kibwezi Teachers college, the Kenya Assemblies Of God located at Muthaiga estate, the Redeemed Gospel Church also at Muthaiga, the Pentecostal Assemblies Of God and the Full Gospel Churches of Kenya. These are the Pentecostal Churches Of Kibwezi.

Transport 

The most common form of transport is public minivans and buses. Within the town and its adjacent areas, motorbikes and bicycles bodaboda are commonly used.

It has a station on the Uganda Railway between Mombasa and Nairobi. There is also a station for the new Mombasa-Nairobi Standard Gauge Railway a few kilometers from the town centre.

The town is located along the Nairobi – Mombasa highway.  Another road connects Kibwezi with Kitui.

See also 
 Transport in Kenya
 Rail transport in Kenya
 Railway stations in Kenya

References

External links 
 Map: UN Map

Masongaleni high school,  124-90136 Nzeeka. A mixed secondary school. The school has a population of 350 students.

Makueni County
Populated places in Eastern Province (Kenya)